The US Metric Association (USMA), based in Windsor, Colorado, is a non-profit organization that advocates for total conversion of the United States to the International System of Units (SI). Founded on 27 December 1916 at Columbia University in New York City, it was originally called the American Metric Association. The USMA publishes a bi-monthly newsletter for its members on the state of the metric system in the United States: Metric Today.

Background

The Metric Act of 1866 declared the metric system to be "lawful throughout the United States of America" and in all business dealings and court proceedings.

At an international commercial congress the Treaty of the Meter, also known as the Metre Convention (Convention du Mètre) of 1875 was signed by 17 countries, including the US, making the metric system the international system of weights and measures. Note that this was a meeting of international states to facilitate commerce. This treaty, then, falls under the overview of the United States Department of State, which has devolved oversight to the United States Department of Commerce.

The Mendenhall Order of 1893 scrapped the previously used standards and definitions for the yard, pound, gallon, and bushel. It adopted the standards of the metric system and redefined the yard, pound, gallon, and bushel in terms of metric units.

The Metric Conversion Act of 1975 started a voluntary metrication process in the US and, as amended by the Omnibus Foreign Trade and Competitiveness Act of 1988, declared the metric system to be “the preferred system of weights and measures for United States trade and commerce”.

Mission

The US Metric Association (USMA) advocates the completion of the ongoing US conversion to the metric system, officially known as the International System of Units (SI).

In support of this mission, the USMA provides a public medium for information and discussion, reports of metrication within the US, a history of the use of metric units in the US, a related bibliography including relevant laws, an answer source for industrial inquiries, a cadre of people knowledgeable about the metric system, training aids and supplies for educators and the public, a certification program that has been used in industry, and various citations and awards for those supporting this mission.

The USMA is in cooperative communication with various state and federal governments, both legislative and executive, and various industrial and professional societies, such as the Institute of Electrical and Electronics Engineers (IEEE), many of whom are involved in standards development.

Short-term goals

The labeling of some goods as to the amount included is regulated by the federal government, for example by means of the Fair Packaging and Labeling Act (FPLA). Some goods are labeled by states or weight-and-measure districts, usually in a manner described by the Uniform Packaging and Labeling Regulation (published by the National Conference on Weights and Measures). Some goods have no labeling guidance.

Complete adoption of the UPLR

The National Conference on Weights and Measures (NCWM) published a revised model Uniform Packaging and Labeling Regulation (UPLR) which went into effect on January 1, 2001. This has been adopted legislatively or by regulation by all but New York State. Once New York State adopts the UPLR, then goods sold in the US not subject to federal regulations and laws may have their contents labeled solely in metric units if that is the desire of the producer or manufacturer. Other producers and manufacturers may continue to provide dual labeling (metric and non-metric) if they so desire. Metric-only labeling would be merely an option. USMA would like to see the UPLR completely adopted.

Amendment of the FPLA

An amendment to the Fair Packaging and Labeling Act (FPLA) has been proposed and is awaiting approval by Congress. This would permit goods sold in the US subject to federal regulations and laws to have their contents labeled solely in metric units if that is the desire of the producer or manufacturer. Other producers and manufacturers may continue to provide dual labeling (metric and non-metric) if they so desire. Metric-only labeling would be merely an option. USMA would like to see this FPLA amendment adopted.

See also
 Metric Martyrs – a group of English greengrocers who were convicted for using unapproved scales
 UK Metric Association
 United States Metric Board
 Metrication in New Zealand
 Metrication in Australia
 European units of measurement directives

References

Metrication in the United States
Organizations based in Colorado
Organizations established in 1916